Morgen Baird (born March 3, 1993) is an American professional stock car racing driver. He has competed in select ARCA Menards Series races since 2016.

Racing career
Baird began racing in go karts in Jackson, Michigan at the age of twelve, and he was able to win in only his second start in the Jr. Sportsman class, before moving up to the Jr. Can class, where he would win the championship in 2007.

Baird would move up to mini-cup racing the following year at Jackson Speedway, where he would finish second in the points. three feature wins and three heat wins. He would also run the Great Lakes Super Mini-Cup Series during that time, and despite missing an opening race due to age restrictions, he would win a race at Owosso Speedway. In 2009, Baird would move up to the GLS Series, finishing runner-up in the points and winning rookie of the year honors that season. He would go on to win the title the following year with five feature race wins, seven poles (with four of them setting new track records), twelve top-5's, and eight heat race wins. He would win the title again in 2011 with twelve poles, six feature race wins, six heat race wins, and eight poles, and would win the title for two more years in 2012 and 2013.

Baird would move to dwarf cars in 2014, driving for Finishline Racing in the MCR Dwarf Series, finishing third in the points that year whilst also winning rookie of the year honors. He would depart the team to race in his own equipment in 2015, and would finish fourth in the points that year.

In 2016, Baird would make his ARCA Racing Series debut at Michigan Speedway driving the No. 64 Chevrolet for Hixson Motorsports, where he would finish 17th. He would repeat that finish  in his next start at Chicagoland Speedway. He would join Jent Motorsports at Kansas Speedway driving the No. 14 Ford and would finish 22nd. It was also during this year that he would make two starts in the World Series of Asphalt Stock Car Racing in the pro late model division. He would two starts at Michigan for the next two years in ARCA, driving for Fast Track Racing with a best finish of 19th in 2018.

In 2019, Baird would run at Salem Speedway for Fast Track in the No. 11, finishing 16th due to a radio issue. He would make two more starts that year, finishing 11th at Michigan, and 13th at Chicagoland. He would make a one off start at Michigan the following year in the No. 10 Ford, finishing 15th due to brake issues.

In 2021, Baird would get his first top-10 finish at Michigan, finishing seventh on the lead lap after starting in that same position. He would finish in the top-10 at the track again in 2022, finishing tenth. It was also during this year that Baird would join Venturini Motorsports in the No. 55 Toyota at the season finale at Toledo Speedway. In a car that shared visual similarities to the No. 20 car of Jesse Love in that same event, he would not start the race and would be classified in 24th.

Personal life
Baird currently resides in Jackson, Michigan.

Motorsports results

ARCA Menards Series 
(key) (Bold – Pole position awarded by qualifying time. Italics – Pole position earned by points standings or practice time. * – Most laps led.)

References

1993 births
Living people
NASCAR drivers
ARCA Menards Series drivers
Racing drivers from Michigan
People from Grass Lake, Michigan